Hypericum buckleyi, known as Buckley's St. Johnswort, is a rare species of flowering plant in the family Hypericaceae that is found only in the Appalachian Mountains of the southeastern United States.

Description
It has peeling, reddish stems with thin bark. Typically just one flower is produced per flowerhead, though it may have up to 5. The ovaries have three parts, forming narrowly ovoid to cylindric capsules.

The species typically flowers in early July and it has been noted for its use as a rock garden shrub or as ground cover.

Distribution and habitat
Its habitat includes wetlands such as seeps, moist crevices, and sometimes roadside ditches.

References

buckleyi
Flora of North Carolina
Flora of South Carolina
Flora of Georgia (U.S. state)
Taxa named by Moses Ashley Curtis